The House of Ruse Gegovski is a historical house in Galičnik that is listed as Cultural heritage of North Macedonia. It is in ownership of one branch of the family of Gegovski.

History of the family

Notable members of the family
 Krste Gegoski ― local activist in the mid 20th century.
 Ivan Gegoski ― local activist in the mid 20th century.

See also
House of Boris and Tomo Bundalevski
House of Tofe Keckarovski
Galičnik Wedding Festival

References

External links
 National Register of objects that are cultural heritage (List updated to December 31, 2012) (In Macedonian)
 Office for Protection of Cultural Heritage (In Macedonian)

Galičnik
Cultural heritage of North Macedonia
Historic houses